Graysville is a city in northwestern Jefferson County, Alabama, United States, located north of Adamsville. At the 2020 census, the population was 1,950.

History
In the late 1800s and early 1900s, this city was called Gin Town. Because it had the only cotton gin for miles around, the community grew. It incorporated as Graysville initially in 1897. As the town grew, the need for businesses and houses of worship grew as well.  One street over from this site, the Union Church was established in the early 1900s.  All people of all denominations met and worshiped there as it was the only church for miles around. In 1927, the town charter was revoked on the grounds of "inactivity."

This city was reincorporated on November 17, 1945.  The first meeting of the town council took place at the old school house on January 16, 1946.  Later that year, the original city council established the Graysville Water Works system.  In 1949, the city council established the Graysville Gas Board which eventually became the Graysville Municipal Gas System. During the 1950s and 1960s, the local coal mines and steel mills attracted families from all over Alabama.  As a result of this growth, Graysville established the city's first series of home developments and subdivisions.  During the 1980s and 1990s, Graysville expanded its city limits by annexing multiple acres in what was then unincorporated in Jefferson County.

Its communities were damaged by an EF3 tornado on January 23, 2012.

Geography
Graysville is located at  (33.626955, -86.962255).

Demographics

2000 census
At the 2000 census, there were 2,344 people, 976 households, and 696 families living in the city. The racial makeup of the city was 75.26% White, 23.12% Black or African American, 0.43% Native American, 0.34% Asian, 0.17% from other races, and 0.68% from two or more races. 0.47% of the population were Hispanic or Latino of any race.

Of the 976 households 24.6% had children under the age of 18 living with them, 50.3% were married couples living together, 16.7% had a female householder with no husband present, and 28.6% were non-families. 25.7% of households were one person and 14.0% were one person aged 65 or older. The average household size was 2.40 and the average family size was 2.85.

The age distribution was 20.9% under the age of 18, 8.2% from 18 to 24, 25.0% from 25 to 44, 25.4% from 45 to 64, and 20.4% 65 or older. The median age was 42 years. For every 100 females, there were 86.2 males. For every 100 females age 18 and over, there were 83.0 males.

The median household income was $30,994 and the median family income  was $35,938. Males had a median income of $30,692 versus $25,446 for females. The per capita income for the city was $16,328. About 8.2% of families and 11.3% of the population were below the poverty line, including 16.5% of those under age 18 and 13.2% of those age 65 or over.

2010 census
At the 2010 census, there were 2,165 people, 907 households, and 607 families living in the city. The racial makeup of the city was 73.9% White, 23.6% Black or African American, 0.4% Native American, 0.2% Asian, 0.4% from other races, and 1.4% from two or more races. 1.7% of the population were Hispanic or Latino of any race.

Of the 907 households 20.7% had children under the age of 18 living with them, 47.0% were married couples living together, 14.7% had a female householder with no husband present, and 33.1% were non-families. 30.2% of households were one person and 12.6% were one person aged 65 or older. The average household size was 2.39 and the average family size was 2.93.

The age distribution was 20.3% under the age of 18, 7.1% from 18 to 24, 24.0% from 25 to 44, 28.7% from 45 to 64, and 19.9% 65 or older. The median age was 44.3 years. For every 100 females, there were 93.8 males. For every 100 females age 18 and over, there were 97.0 males.

The median household income was $35,750 and the median family income  was $44,926. Males had a median income of $37,156 versus $30,917 for females. The per capita income for the city was $16,308. About 15.9% of families and 20.1% of the population were below the poverty line, including 21.5% of those under age 18 and 13.0% of those age 65 or over.

2020 census

As of the 2020 United States census, there were 1,950 people, 765 households, and 542 families residing in the city.

References

External links
City of Graysville
Graysville Public Library

Cities in Alabama
Cities in Jefferson County, Alabama
Birmingham metropolitan area, Alabama